Tiger is a 1979 Indian Telugu-language action film, produced by Parvathaneni Narayana Rao and directed by Nandamuri Ramesh. The film stars N. T. Rama Rao, Rajinikanth, Radha Saluja and Subhashini, with music composed by Satyam. It was also Rajinikanth's 50th film as an actor. The film is a remake of the Hindi film Khoon Pasina (1977).

Plot 
Raja and Rashid are best friends and soulmates, both their families also live united without any communal feeling. In their childhood, a dacoit, Kotinagulu tries to kill an innocent person Ramadasu, Raja's father and Rashid's father protect him with the help of villagers. Keeping that grudge in mind, Kotinagulu, along with his associate Ranga set the entire village on fire, in which both the families are ruined. Raja and Rashid are separated and Raja is brought up by Rashid's mother Fathima Begum. Seeing the depravities of Kotinagulu, his wife Rukmini leaves the house along with daughter Shanti to her brother, who is a school teacher. Years roll by, Raja becomes a brave and courageous guy, the public call him Tiger. He is still burning for revenge against Kotinagulu and his life's ambition is to catch him. With the help of Ramadasu, Raja starts searching for Kotinagulu. Kotinagulu turns into Zamindar Jagannadham as a respectable person in the society, but in the underground, he continues his illegal activities and is searching for his wife and child who abandoned him. Raja loves a beautiful girl Rekha and plans to marry her. Bhumayya, Rekha's father objects to the marriage knowing that Raja's mother is a Muslim. Raja's mother reveals the entire story to Bhumayya and he happily accepts the alliance.

Meanwhile, Rashid becomes a CBI officer and he is appointed by the Govt. to catch Kotinagulu, which makes him happy. The department portrays him as a huge burglar Ustad, who has robbed 10 lakhs worth of diamonds. Kotinagulu's wife Rukmini and daughter Shanti run a tea stall for their livelihood. In his travel, Rashid gets acquaintance with Shanti and both of them fall in love. Zamindar captivates Rashid for the diamonds he has stolen, when Rashid recognizes him as Kotinagulu, also sees the photographs of Zamindar's wife and child and understands that Shanti is Kotinagulu's daughter. Rashid trashes the gang and escapes. Meanwhile, Zamindar learns that Raja is searching for him, so, he sends Ranga to kill Raja, Ramadasu saves him and recognizes Ranga as Kotinagulu's associate. Raja chases Ranga to the den of Kotinagulu, but he is captured by them and kept in an electric cage. Ramadasu sacrifices his life and releases Raja from the cage. Eventually, Zamindar plans to steal the diamond necklace of the goddess in Mahakalijathara, but Raja does not allow their attempts. At the same time, Zamindar sees his brother-in-law the School Master and threatens him to tell about his wife and child when he does not reveal it, he kills him. Before dying, Master asks Raja to safeguard his sister and Shanti. Meanwhile, Zamindar kidnaps Fathima and Rekha and sends Ranga to get Rukmini and Shanti. Raja obstructs Ranga's way, tells him that Kotinagulu should personally come and take them. Knowing that Shanti is in Raja's custody, angered Rashid goes to attack him, a serious clash arises between them and in that quarrel both of them recognize each other. Now they join hands and see the end of Kotinagulu and his gang. The movie ends with the reunion of family and the marriages of Raja and Rekha, and Rashid and Shanti.

Cast

Soundtrack 

Music composed by Satyam.

References

External links 
 

1979 films
Indian action drama films
Telugu remakes of Hindi films
Films scored by Satyam (composer)
1970s Telugu-language films
1970s action drama films